Kristin Viktoria Amparo Sundberg (born 1 December 1983) is a Swedish singer. She attended Adolf Fredrik's Music School in Stockholm. She participated in season 1 of the Swedish X Factor in 2012, which was broadcast on TV4, where she made it to the judge's houses stage before being eliminated. Amparo participated in Melodifestivalen 2015 with the song "I See You" in the third semi-final. She made it to the "Second Chance" round but failed to make it to the Melodifestivalen final.

Discography

Singles

As lead artist

As featured artist

References

Living people
1983 births
Colombian emigrants to Sweden
Swedish adoptees
Swedish people of Colombian descent
Swedish pop singers
21st-century Swedish singers
21st-century Swedish women singers
Melodifestivalen contestants of 2015